KUNA-FM is a commercial regional Mexican music radio station in La Quinta, California, broadcasting to the Palm Springs, California, area on 96.7 FM. It is owned by News-Press & Gazette Company, through its Gulf-California Broadcast Company subsidiary.

History
KBZT-FM "K-Best" signed on the air in August 1987 with a syndicated adult standards format. The call letters had been scooped up on October 2, 1986, from the Los Angeles station that dropped them to become KLSX just days before. On February 17, 1992, KBZT-FM flipped to country music, citing the high popularity of country nationwide and the lack of a local country station on FM.

The country music came to an end on October 1, 1993, when the station became a simulcast with KUNA (1400 AM) as KUNA-FM. The flip came about even though KBZT outrated KUNA at the time.

References

External links
La Poderosa 96.7 Facebook

UNA-FM
Regional Mexican radio stations in the United States
News-Press & Gazette Company
UNA-FM
La Quinta, California
Radio stations established in 1987
1987 establishments in California